Linda O. Cook (June 8, 1948 – April 12, 2012) was an American actress, best known for her portrayal of Egypt Jones Masters on the American daytime soap opera Loving from 1988 to 1991, and from 1993 to 1994.

Early life 
Cook was born in Lubbock, Texas, but left there at age three due to her father's frequent job transfers. While attending high school in Atlanta, Georgia, Cook was accepted into the Atlanta Civic Ballet and toured with the group.

Career 
She made her off-Broadway debut in the 1974 play The Wager and would go on to appear in several other off-Broadway plays. In 1985, she starred opposite Carroll O'Connor and Frances Sternhagen in the Broadway play Home Front.

Cook appeared on One Life to Live, Guiding Light, As the World Turns, Ryan's Hope, All My Children, Real Ghosts (aka Haunted Lives: True Ghost Stories) and The Edge of Night.

She voiced Leech Woman in Puppet Master, and Baby Oopsie Daisy in Demonic Toys, although it was uncredited.

Personal life
She was diagnosed with breast cancer in the early-1990s and died in 2012 at age 63.

Filmography

Film

Television

References

Actresses from Texas
American television actresses
American soap opera actresses
American stage actresses
American voice actresses
People from Lubbock, Texas
1948 births
2012 deaths
21st-century American women